Strongyloides lutrae is a parasitic roundworm infecting the small intestine of the otter, Lutra canadensis. It was first described from Louisiana.

References

Further reading

External links

Strongylidae
Parasitic nematodes of mammals
Nematodes described in 1966